Kemnay (Gaelic: Camnaidh) is a village  west of Aberdeen in Garioch, Aberdeenshire, Scotland.

History 
The village name Kemnay is believed to originate from the Celtic words that mean "little crook in the river" due to the village location on the bend of the River Don. Kemnay House is classified by Historic Scotland as a category A listed building.

The village was served by Kemnay railway station on the Alford Valley Railway from 1859 to 1950. The alignment through the village has been lost to housing developments.

The pre-Reformation church was dedicated to St Anne. The parish was united with Craigern in 1500 and both came under the umbrella of nearby Kinkell. The old church was extensively rebuilt in 1632.

The current parish church dates from 1844. The pre-1844 church was of unusual cruciform style, with the earth floor 1m below the surrounding ground, and prone to icing in winter. The two upper galleries were accessed by earth ramps in the graveyard. The church was enlarged in 1871 by Rev George Peter of St Cyrus.

The village was substantially rebuilt after the creation of Kemnay railway station in 1858.

It shares its name with Kemnay a small community in Manitoba, Canada. It is located in the Rural Municipality of Whitehead about 10 kilometres west of Brandon on PTH 1A.

Notable people

David Leitch (b.1608) minister of the parish and Chaplain to King Charles II

Religion 
Kemnay has church buildings available for the following religious groups:
 Church of Scotland
 Roman Catholic
 Scottish Episcopal Church
 [Jehovah’s Witnesses]

Tourism 
Kemnay is popular with explorers of Aberdeenshire who can stay in numerous guest houses, hotels, and bed and breakfasts within the village. There are two pubs, the Bennachie Lodge and the Burnett Arms Hotel.

Granite
Kemnay Quarry was opened in 1830 by John Fyfe, and began commercial operation in 1858. Fyfe invented the Blondin aerial ropeway system at Kemnay in 1872.

Kemnay Granite has been used in many famous buildings and structures, including;

 Cenotaph, Glasgow
 Forth Railway Bridge, Edinburgh/Fife
 Marischal College, Aberdeen
 Kew Bridge and Putney Bridge, London
 Thames Embankment, London

Granite workers from Kemnay helped to quarry and shape the Australian granite used in the Sydney Harbour Bridge. They also travelled to quarries in California, the Mississippi Levees and Odessa.

Places of interest 
 James Mitchell Memorial
 Fetternear Estate
 Fetternear Palace, archaeological dig site (Bishop's Palace)
 Johnstone FM Monument
 Kemnay Academy
 View Point (Place of Origin)
 War Memorial
 Kemnay morthouse in the parish churchyard This is dated 1831 over its iron door.

Sports
Kemnay has various sports clubs, including;
 Badminton
 Bowling Club
 Cricket
 Football
 Golf
 Tennis

There are playing fields available for use by the public at Bogbeth Park, which is also home to the Kemnay Skate Park.

Golfer Paul Lawrie, who won the 1999 Open Championship is a former pupil of Kemnay Academy, as is former Aberdeen F.C. footballer Darren Mackie.

In April 2017, a gym opened in the village, Station 83.

Education

In Kemnay, there are two primary schools and one secondary school:

 Kemnay Primary School
 Alehousewells Primary School
 Kemnay Academy, which unveiled a £14.3 million extension in 2015.

References 
Citations

Bibliography

External links 

 Kemnay Village Website
Kemnay Academy

Villages in Aberdeenshire